Phasis was an ancient and early medieval city on the eastern Black Sea coast, near modern Poti in Georgia.

After the introduction of Christianity Phasis was the see of a Greek diocese one of whose bishops, Cyrus, became a Patriarch of Alexandria between AD 630 and 641.

Titular see 

In 1929, the diocese was nominally restored as a Latin titular archbishopric of the highest (Metropolitan) rank.

It is vacant since decades, having had the following archiepiscopal incumbents:
 Constantino Ajutti (1925.05.28 – death 1928.07.29) as papal diplomat: Apostolic Delegate (below embassy level) to (then French) Indochina (1925.05.28 – 1928.07.29)
 William Mark Duke (1928.08.10 – 1931.10.05) as Coadjutor Archbishop of Vancouver (British Columbia, Canada) (1928.08.10 – 1931.10.05), later succeeded as Metropolitan Archbishop of Vancouver (1931.10.05 – 1964.03.11), emeritate as Titular Archbishop of Seleucia in Isauria (1964.03.11 – 1971.08.31)
 Geevarghese Ivanios Giorgio Tommaso Panickerveetil, Order of the Imitation of Christ (O.I.C.) (1932.02.13 – 1932.06.11) as former Founder (1919) and first Superior General of Order of the Imitation of Christ (1919 – 1932.02.13); next first ''Metropolitan of Trivandrum of the Syro-Malankars (southern India, Syro-Malankar Rite) (1932.06.11 – death 1953.07.15)
 Jacques Leen, Holy Ghost Fathers (C.S.Sp.) (1933.08.01 – death 1949.12.19), as personal promotion and on emeritate as former Titular Bishop of Hippo Diarrhytus (1925.07.15 – 1926.04.16) and Coadjutor Bishop of Port-Louis (Mauritius) (1925.07.15 – 1926.04.16), succeeding as Bishop of Port-Louis (1926.04.16 – 1949.12.19), then Archbishop ad personam (1933.08.01 – 1949.12.19)
 Louis-Gabriel-Xavier Jantzen (尚唯善), Paris Foreign Missions Society (M.E.P.) (1950.10.24 – death 1953.08.28); emeritate as former Titular Bishop of Tremithus (1926.02.16 – 1946.04.11) and last Apostolic Vicar of Chongqing 重慶 (China) (1926.02.16 – 1946.04.11) promoted as first Metropolitan Archbishop of Chongqing 重慶 (1946.04.11 – 1950.10.24)
 Henri Audrain (1954.02.03 – 1955.03.02) as Coadjutor Archbishop of Auch (France) (1954.02.03 – 1955.03.02), succeeded as Metropolitan Archbishop of Auch (1955.03.02 – 1968.04.16), emeritate as Titular Archbishop of Mimiana (1968.04.16 – resigned 1970.12.10), died 1982; previously Titular Bishop of Arsinoë in Arcadia (1938.10.22 – 1954.02.03) as Auxiliary Bishop of Versailles (France) (1938.10.22 – 1954.02.03)
 Arturo Mery Beckdorf (1955.04.20 – death 1976.05.28), first as Coadjutor Archbishop of Santiago (Chile) (1955.04.20 – 1961.05.14), then as Auxiliary Bishop of La Serena (Chile) (1961.05.14 – 1963), next as Coadjutor Archbishop of La Serena (1963 – 1976.05.28); previously Titular Bishop of Parnassus (1941.03.22 – 1944.07.29) as Auxiliary Bishop of Antofagasta (Chile) (1941.03.22 – 1944.07.29)

Notes

References 
 
 

Catholic titular sees in Asia
Catholic titular sees in Europe